Rigabad (also Romanized as Rīgābād; also known as Rik Abad) is a village in Maskun Rural District, Jebalbarez District, Jiroft County, Kerman Province, Iran. At the 2006 census, its population was 107, in 22 families.

References 

Populated places in Jiroft County